There's a Story to This Moral is the fifth album by Canadian punk rock group Choke.  It was released through Smallman Records in 2002.

Reception

AllMusic reviewer Jason MacNeil stated that "this quartet walks the thin tightrope between nu-metal, '80s heavy metal, and emo rock smartly, making each tune twist and turn to suit their needs. ... the influences range from punk revival groups such as blink-182 to even the art rock riffs of Rush", giving the album a rating of three stars.

Track listing
All songs written and composed by Choke.

 "Far from True" – 4:44
 "Concrete Timeline" – 3:57
 "Every Word" – 2:56
 "Signing Off" – 4:09
 "Forget to Learn" – 2:40
 "Fallout Leader" – 5:29
 "Record Stop" – 5:07
 "Framed in Poor Light" – 4:21
 "Fourteen Days" – 3:27
 "The Hardest Things to See Are on Display" – 6:15

Personnel
 Jack Jaggard – guitar, vocals
 Shawn Moncrieff – guitar, vocals
 Clay Shea – bass guitar, vocals
 Stefan Levasseur – drums

References

2002 albums
Choke (band) albums